The Icelandic Athletic Federation (Icelandic  Frjálsíþróttasamband Íslands) is the governing body for the sport of athletics in Iceland.

Affiliations 
World Athletics
European Athletic Association (EAA)
National Olympic and Sports Association of Iceland

National records 
FRÍ maintains the Icelandic records in athletics.

External links 
Official webpage 

Iceland
Athletics
National governing bodies for athletics
Sports organizations established in 1947
1947 establishments in Iceland